Zachary Lazar (born 1968) is an American novelist.  Lazar was born in Phoenix, Arizona.  He earned an A.B. degree in Comparative Literature from Brown University (1990) and M.F.A from the University of Iowa Iowa Writer's Workshop (1993).  In 2015, he was the third recipient of the John Updike Award from the American Academy of Arts and Letters, "given biennially to a writer in mid-career whose work has demonstrated consistent excellence."

Career
Lazar published his first novel, Aaron, Approximately, in 1998.  His second novel, Sway, was a finalist for the Discover Great New Writers Award at Barnes & Noble and was an Editor's Choice at the New York Times Book Review. Appropriating such real-life iconic figures as the early Rolling Stones, Charles Manson acolyte Bobby Beausoleil, and the avant-garde filmmaker Kenneth Anger, Sway is a novelistic exploration of the rise and fall of the Sixties counterculture. The story of the film Invocation of My Demon Brother, its making, and the people involved were the inspiration for it. It was selected as a best book of 2008 by the Los Angeles Times, Publishers Weekly, Newsday, Rolling Stone, the St. Louis Post-Dispatch, and other publications.  In 2009, Lazar published the memoir Evening's Empire: The Story of My Father's Murder.  It was selected as a Best Book of 2009 by the Chicago Tribune. Lazar's third novel, I Pity the Poor Immigrant, tells the story of a fictional American journalist whose investigation into the killing of an Israeli poet leads her into a millennia-old history of violence that encompasses the American and Israeli mafias, the biblical figure of King David, and the Jewish gangster Meyer Lansky.  The book was an Editor's Choice at the New York Times Book Review as well as one of that publications's 100 Notable Books of 2014.

Lazar's articles and reviews have appeared in the New York Times Magazine, the Los Angeles Times, Newsday, BOMB magazine, and elsewhere.  In 2011, he joined the faculty of Tulane University.

Awards and grants 

 Fine Arts Work Center, 1994-5
 James Michener-Copernicus Society Award, 1998
 Barnes & Noble Discover Award finalist for Sway
 Guggenheim Fellowship (2009–2010)
 Hodder Fellow, Princeton University (2009–2010)
 John Updike Award, American Academy of Arts and Letters (2015)

Books 
 Aaron, Approximately (1998), 
 Sway (2008), 
 Evening's Empire: The Story of My Father's Murder (2009), 
 I Pity the Poor Immigrant (2014), 
 Vengeance (2018),

References

External links 
 Author's website
 New York Times Book Review of Sway.
 Zachary Lazar page at the Guggenheim Foundation
 Zachary Lazar page at Princeton University's Lewis Center for the Arts
 Lazar's profile of the musician Girl Talk in the New York Times Magazine
 Zachary Lazar interviewed by Michael Silverblatt on KCRW's Bookworm
 Zachary Lazar interviewed by novelist Christopher Sorrentino in BOMB magazine
 New York Times Living With Music Playlist by Zachary Lazar
 James Wood review of I Pity The Poor Immigrant in The New Yorker
 New York Times Book Review of I Pity the Poor Immigrant

American historical novelists
Tulane University faculty
Living people
1968 births
American male novelists
Writers from Phoenix, Arizona
Brown University alumni
Iowa Writers' Workshop alumni
20th-century American novelists
21st-century American novelists
20th-century American male writers
21st-century American male writers
Novelists from Louisiana
Novelists from Arizona